Bennett Davison (born November 21, 1975) is a retired American basketball player who played professionally for over ten years, including several seasons in Italy's Lega Basket Serie A. Davison is also known for his success as a college player, where he was a starter on the University of Arizona's 1997 NCAA championship team.

Davison was born in San Francisco and raised in Sebastopol, California. He was lightly recruited after his high school career at Analy High School and landed at West Valley College, a community college. After two strong seasons, Davison attracted the attention of coach Lute Olson at Arizona, and was offered a scholarship with the Wildcats.

In his first season at Arizona, Davison started at power forward as the young Wildcats entered the 1997 NCAA Tournament as a #4 seed with a 19–9 record. They swept through the field to win the national championship, becoming the first team to beat three top seeds (Kansas, North Carolina and Kentucky) in the process. In Davison's senior season, the team returned all five starters and was ranked #1 in the preseason, but was upset in the regional final by Utah. For his Arizona career, Davison averaged 8.6 points and 6.5 rebounds per game and started 61 of 69 contests in his two seasons.

Following the close of his college career, Davison was not selected in the 1998 NBA draft. He instead began an overseas career, taking him to Turkey, Australia, Slovenia, Italy, Greece, Mexico, Venezuela and the Dominican Republic. He played in Lega Basket Serie A, Italy's top league, averaging 9.5 points and 5.8 rebounds in his three-year career there.

Davison tried to make it to the NBA during his professional career. In 1999, he played for the Vancouver Grizzlies in the NBA Summer League. He was featured in the Denver Nuggets' roster at the 2002 Rocky Mountain Revue in Salt Lake City. On October 12, 2002, he signed as free agent with the Los Angeles Clippers and was given a minimum contract. On October 24, 2002, he was waived.

References

External links
Lega Serie A profile
Legadue profile

1975 births
Living people
American expatriate basketball people in Australia
American expatriate basketball people in Croatia
American expatriate basketball people in the Dominican Republic
American expatriate basketball people in Greece
American expatriate basketball people in Italy
American expatriate basketball people in Mexico
American expatriate basketball people in Slovenia
American expatriate basketball people in Turkey
American expatriate basketball people in Venezuela
American men's basketball players
Arizona Wildcats men's basketball players
Basket Napoli players
Basketball players from San Francisco
Centers (basketball)
Galatasaray S.K. (men's basketball) players
Gold Coast Blaze players
Huracanes de Tampico players
Junior college men's basketball players in the United States
KK Cibona players
KK Krka players
Melbourne Tigers players
Olimpia Milano players
Power forwards (basketball)
Rethymno B.C. players
Scafati Basket players
Virtus Bologna players
West Valley College alumni